Alphonse Jean Henri (Fons) Wijnen (Lieze, Visé, (Belgium), 7 June 1912Leende, 7 March 2001) was a Dutch soldier. He was the officer in charge when the Rawagede massacre took place during the Indonesian National Revolution in which Dutch troops killed over 400 Indonesian civilians.

World War II
Wijnen was born as the eldest in a family of ten children. He married and had two children before World War II broke out. After the war he had two children. During the war he fled as Engelandvaarder, through France and Spain to Britain.

Rawagede massacre

After the war he was sent to the Dutch East Indies for three years and served with the Royal Dutch East Indies Army during the Indonesian National Revolution. Wijnen was involved in a massacre in Rawagede. Despite the recommendation of General Simon Spoor to prosecute Wijnen, in 1947 Dutch Attorney General. H. A. Felderhof decided not to prosecute the responsible major for war crimes.

Post Indonesian independence
Major Wijnen was promoted to colonel and appointed battalion commander to the Major General de Ruyter of Steveninck Barracks in Oirschot and later as garrison commander of Eindhoven.

Colonel Wijnen was an Officer in the Order of Orange-Nassau with swords.

References

https://web.archive.org/web/20131111203353/http://www.wynen.net/memoriam.htm
https://www.facebook.com/photo.php?fbid=183565008494882&set=p.183565008494882&type=1&theater

Dutch people of the Indonesian National Revolution
Officers of the Order of Orange-Nassau
Engelandvaarders
Dutch war crimes
1912 births
2001 deaths
People from Visé